Extreme Trains is a television program on The History Channel that describes the daily operations of the railroads in the United States of America, from coal trains to passenger trains and famous routes. It is hosted by Matt Bown, a train conductor for Pan Am Railways in Maine, whose interest is railways and the technology of them. In the show Matt is living his lifelong dream.

The series was first aired in the United States on November 11, 2008 and ran until December 30, 2008. The show has since been shown in the United Kingdom in April 2009.

Conception and development
History Channel program executive said the show was developed to appeal to the channels core audience, who "love to be wowed by big machinery and fun facts". Bown was chosen to host the show after responding to an open-call audition. McKillop said Bown "has a sense of authenticity and a wonderful, boyish enthusiasm...when the camera's on him, he's infectious."

Production
The show's producers occasionally had difficulty convincing railroads to participate in the show, due to the possibility of film crews disrupting crews and workers. The show's crew was required to take a special safety course before filming with Amtrak.

Broadcast history

Reception
Extreme Trains received mixed reviews from critics. Library Journal recommended the DVD set, with reviewer Lawrence Maxted commending Matt Bown's enthusiasm and "solid job of explaining rail operations." Maxted said the show featured "superb camerawork" and "dramatic background music", adding that the show would be "coveted by rail fans and of interest to general viewers". The Times called the show "trainspotting for adrenaline junkies" giving railroading a "full-on, hyperbolic treatment". Writing for the Daily News (New York), David Hinckley said Extreme Trains was "not a bad show", but he criticized Bown's hosting style and the focus on technical details. Hinckley said that Bown "borders on self-parody" with his "dramatic inflection" describing "every move to the camera lens". He said the show would be better if Bown would "trust the trains" and not "frame a routine daily coal train run as a life-or-death drama", saying that Bown's tone makes it seem "a miracle any train completes its run at all".

References

External links
 The History Channel - Episode guide

History (American TV channel) original programming
2008 American television series debuts
2008 American television series endings